2017 T10 League was the inaugural season of the T10 League. The matches had a 10-over-a-side format with a time duration of 90 minutes. The tournament was played over four days, with a round robin followed by semifinals and the final. It was played from 14–17 December at the Sharjah Cricket Stadium.

Squads

Fixtures
''All times are in United Arab Emirates Standard Time (UTC+4). All matches will be held in the United Arab Emirates.

Group stage

Group A

Group B

Playoffs

 Advanced to Semi-finals
 Advanced to 5th place play-off

5th place play-off

Semi-finals

Final

References 

2017 in Emirati cricket
Abu Dhabi T10 League